Tournament Table is a 1978 arcade video game released by Atari, Inc. The Atari VCS version is called Video Olympics.

Gameplay
Tournament Table is basically a multi-game arcade with several Pong variations. After inserting a coin, the player is prompted to choose one of the several games available. Those games are:
 Breakout
 Soccer (2 variations)
 Foozpong
 Hockey (3 variations)
 Quadra Pong
 Handball
 Basketball (2 variations)

Breakout is the only one-player game, the other being for two, three, or four players.

References

1978 video games
Atari arcade games
Pong variations
Video games developed in the United States